Francis Talbot, 11th Earl of Shrewsbury, 11th Earl of Waterford (1623 – 16 March 1668), was an English peer who was a Royalist officer in the English Civil War. He survived the war only to be mortally wounded in a duel with the Duke of Buckingham who was having an affair with his wife.

Life
Talbot was the second son of John Talbot, 10th Earl of Shrewsbury, by his first marriage to Mary Fortescue. Francis Talbot was a captain in the royalist armies during the English Civil War and fought at the Battle of Worcester in 1651. Following the royalist defeat there he fled abroad to Europe but returned to England before February 1654, the month he succeeded to his father's earldom, when he petitioned the Lord Protector, Oliver Cromwell, to pardon him for all offences against Parliament. He was suspected of complicity in the unsuccessful royalist rising by Sir George Booth in August 1659 in the period between Cromwell's death and the restoration of King Charles II in 1660.

Shrewsbury was readily employed in Charles' court. He bore the Second Sword at the king's coronation in 1661, and in the same year was made Lord Housekeeper of Hampton Court and Treasurer and Receiver-General of Ireland.

After his first wife and two young sons had died, Shrewsbury (who had succeeded to his father's titles in 1654) married the "notorious" Lady Anna Maria Brudenell, a daughter of the 2nd Earl of Cardigan, on 10 January 1659.

On 16 January 1668, he duelled with one of his wife's lovers, George Villiers, 2nd Duke of Buckingham, and was mortally wounded, dying two months later of his injury. He was buried at the parish church of Albrighton in Shropshire.

Samuel Pepys wrote of the incident:

His wife is said to have disguised herself as a page and held Villiers' horse during the duel and afterwards slept with him while he wore the blood-stained shirt he had been wearing when he wounded her husband. The earl had had two sons with Maria Brudenell. He was succeeded by his eldest son, Charles. His second son, John Talbot (1665–1686), was also killed in a duel by Henry FitzRoy, 1st Duke of Grafton (the illegitimate son of King Charles II), Talbot "having given the Duke of Grafton very unhandsome and provoking language".

Notes

References
Burke's Peerage & Gentry

1623 births
1668 deaths
Duelling fatalities
Francis
People from Bromsgrove
Earls of Shrewsbury
Earls of Waterford